Slayer Slang: A Buffy the Vampire Slayer Lexicon is a 2003 academic publication relating to the fictional Buffyverse established by TV series, Buffy and Angel.

Book description

A distinguishing feature of the series Buffy was the way in which the show's writers play with language: making new words, changing existing ones, and turning common usage around. Michael Adams argues this creates a resonant lexicon reflecting power in both youth culture and television on the changes in American slang.

Contents

Michael Adams starts the book with a synopsis of the program's history and a defense of ephemeral language. The main body of the work is the detailed glossary of slayer slang, annotated with dialogue. The book concludes with a bibliography and a lengthy index, a guide to sources (novels based on the show, magazine articles about the show, and language culled from the official posting board) and an appendix of slang-making suffixes.

Glossary examples

A few examples from the Slayer Slang glossary:

bitca n

break and enterish adj suitable for crime 

carbon-dated adj very out of date

cuddle-monkey n male lover

Books about the Buffyverse
American slang
2003 non-fiction books
Slang dictionaries